Sir Edward Waldegrave, 1st Baronet (c. 1568 – c. 1650) was an English soldier, MP and Cavalier during the English Civil War and a grandson of Sir Edward Waldegrave.

Waldegrave was knighted by King James I in 1607. In 1643, he was made a baronet by King Charles I, but the Rump Parliament later declared the creation invalid and it only became effective after the English Restoration. Though aged over seventy when civil war broke out in 1642, Waldegrave commanded a royalist horse regiment in Cornwall and secured the passage through Saltash against the 3rd Earl of Essex's troops, being twice unhorsed but eventually taking forty Roundhead prisoners. His fortune later turned however, when the Royalists were defeated: he was forced to pay £50,000 (approximately £3,700,000 in early-2000s terms) in fines and sequestrations and died soon after.

References

1560s births
1650s deaths
Baronets in the Baronetage of England
Cavaliers
Edward Waldegrave, 1st Baronet, Sir
16th-century English people
17th-century English military personnel
People from Hever, Kent